Niška Banja is a town and one of five city municipalities which constitute the city of Niš. It is also one of the spa resorts in Serbia.

According to the 2011 census, the population of the town is 4,380, while the population of the municipality is 14,098.

Geography
The municipality borders Palilula and Medijana municipalities in the west, Pantelej municipality in the north-west, Svrljig municipality in the north, Bela Palanka municipality in the east, and Gadžin Han municipality in the south. Niška Banja is situated at the bottom of Suva Planina Mountain. The closest airport is Niš Constantine the Great Airport.

Demographics
As of 2011 census, the municipality has a population of 14,098 inhabitants, with 4,380 in the eponymous settlement.

Settlements

Tourism
Niška Banja spa is one of the best known centers of health tourism in Serbia and it is the third most popular spa in Serbia after Vrnjačka Banja and Sokobanja. It is well known for its hot, radio-active water containing radon. The spa is home of a Summer cultural festival. There are several hotels in Niška Banja: Partizan, Radon, Srbija, Ozren, and Terme. Also, numerous villas are available.

History
Niška Banja is situated at the bottom of Suva Planina Mountain. It was first mentioned centuries ago, in 448, and with the remains and traces of antique (thermae - public baths ll cent.) and early Byzantine period it has been keeping its tradition and uniqueness. Saint Proust noted once down in 1768 that its bathroom in open was like the one in Budim. Even rice was grown here once.

During the 1920s, Banja started to develop intensively and methodically. Lights appeared in 1925, many famous people built their villas, promenades and parks were arranged, comfortable hotels were built and trams came from Niš all the way there in 1929. Today the spa is served by frequent buses instead of trams.

Health
Niška Banja is thought to heal coronary and blood vessels diseases, increased blood pressure and rheumatic disorders. It also offers the treatment of orthopedic injuries, body weight control, anti-cellulite treatments and postoperative rehabilitation. The Institute of Niška Banja is equipped with modern amenities.

International relations

Twin towns — Sister cities
Niška Banja is twinned with:
 Sofades, Greece

Notable people
Ljubiša Samardžić, grew up in Jelašnica
Vojislav V. Jovanović, Serbian novelist and writer of short stories, prose and poems.

Gallery

See also 
 List of spa towns in Serbia

References

External links 

Official website of the Municipality of Niska Banja
Web portal with accommodation in Niska Banja
Web portal Niska Banja

Populated places in Nišava District
Municipalities of Niš
Spa towns in Serbia